Ryan Austin (born 15 November 1984) is an English professional football manager and former player.

Playing career
Austin was born in Stoke-on-Trent. After starting out as a trainee at Crewe Alexandra in 2004 he was later promoted to the first-team. He then had a successful loan spell at Burton Albion impressing manager Nigel Clough. In August 2004, he signed for Burton Albion on a free transfer from Crewe. A regular for Burton in the Football Conference, Austin made his Football League debut on 8 August 2009 in a 3–1 away defeat to Shrewsbury Town. Austin has also played for the England C national football team at semi-professional level.

Austin was ruled out until the end of the 2009–10 season with a torn knee ligament. He made his return to the side after injury against Rotherham United on 11 September 2010. Austin was released by Burton Albion at the end of the 2011–12 campaign. In July 2012 he joined Kidderminster Harriers. In October 2012 he joined Brackley Town on loan. In January 2013, Austin joined Brackley on a permanent deal.

Coaching career
In August 2016 Austin joined Kidsgrove Athletic as a player-manager, replacing Peter Ward. Due to bad results, he was fired on 19 March 2020.

On 29 March 2020, Austin was appointed manager of Congleton Town. Due to a change of personal circumstances, Austin left the club on 24 May 2021.

References

External links

1984 births
Living people
Footballers from Stoke-on-Trent
English footballers
Crewe Alexandra F.C. players
Burton Albion F.C. players
Kidderminster Harriers F.C. players
English Football League players
National League (English football) players
Brackley Town F.C. players
Kidsgrove Athletic F.C. players
Kidsgrove Athletic F.C. managers
England semi-pro international footballers
Association football defenders
English football managers